Georges-Marie Baltus (3 May 1874 – 24 December 1967) was a Belgian painter. His work was part of the painting event in the art competition at the 1932 Summer Olympics. His son was painter Ado Baltus.

References

Further sources
 Leuvense kunst van de XX eeuw (exhibition catalogue), Leuven, 1971
 Georges-Marie Baltus 1874-1967, De Facto, 3, 1991
 N. Hostyn & CH. Giel: "Georges-Marie Baltus" in Allgemeines Künstlerlexikon, 6, Leipzig-München, 1992, p. 526
 P. Piron: De Belgische beeldende kunstenaars uit de 19de en 20ste eeuw. Uitgeverij Art in Belgium (1999), 
 L. Raskin: Een eeuw beeldende kunst in Limburg, Hasselt, 2004

1874 births
1967 deaths
20th-century Belgian painters
Belgian painters
Olympic competitors in art competitions
People from Kortrijk